Sheoo Mewalal (also known as Sahu Mewalal; 1 July 1926 – 27 December 2008) was an Indian footballer in Kolkata. He played as a striker and was known for his fitness, bicycle kicks, and goal-scoring abilities, especially using the rabona kick.

Mewalal's playing career with a reported 1032 goals along with 32 hat-tricks in both the official and exhibition matches, was ended in 1958 due to an injury.

Childhood and early career
Mewalal was born in Daulatpur in Chitarghati Panchayat of the Gaya district (now Nawada district) in Bihar, to Sahoo Mahadeoram and Kusumi Devi. He spent his early days playing football with the seeds of a tar tree near the banks of the Khuri River, which flows through his village.

In 1937, his family moved to Calcutta (now Kolkata). His father worked at Fort William, and the family resided in the Fort William and Hastings neighborhoods. Once in Calcutta, Mewalel's footballing talent was noticed by Sergeant Barnett who helped him join the Morning Star Club. Barnett would become his first coach. Known for his ability to shoot with both feet, Mewalal credited Sergeant R. Blackey for helping him learn the technique. Earlier coached by Bagha Som, he began playing as a right-in and was eventually urged by the club to play in the center-forward position, considering his physique and ball-shooting technique.

He began playing for the Napier Club the following year. He made his name at the club after scoring an important goal in a draw against Grear Sporting Club. Mewalal also represented Bengal in Santosh Trophy and played alongside Sailen Manna, and won the tournament in 1953–54 season, in which he scored a goal in their 3–1 win against Mysore in final. Managed by Balaidas Chatterjee, Bengal won multiple Santosh Trophy titles during that time, and Mewalal scored all total 39 goals for the team.

Club career
Mewalal started his senior career in 1938 with Kidderpore SC which was then playing in the 2nd Division of the Calcutta Football League. He came into the limelight in 1944 when he scored the winning goal for the IFA XI against India XI. In 1945, he joined the 1st Division club Aryans, one of the oldest clubs in the country. It was his hat-trick for Aryans in the same year against Mohun Bagan A.C. in a Calcutta league match that impressed the then Mohun Bagan captain Sailen Manna. Mewalal also appeared with another Calcutta Football League side George Telegraph.

In 1946, he joined Mohun Bagan and played under captaincy of Manna. In 1947, he joined the Eastern Railway Football Club. After spending eight years with them, he joined BNR Football Club. In 1958, while playing in an Inter-Railway tournament in Kharagpur, he broke his knee. This incident ended Mewalal's illustrious 20-year career.

During his club career, Mewalel scored more than 150 goals in the local league. He also scored 39 goals—including five hat-tricks—for BNR in the Santosh Trophy competition. Mewalal was the top scorer in the Calcutta Football League on four occasions. He achieved this feat in 1949, 1951, and 1954 for Eastern Railways and in 1958 for BNR. He also scored a record of 32 hat-tricks in local football tournaments, a record unbroken to this day. Mewalal scored 1032 goals in his career, in official and unofficial games.

International career
Playing for the India national team, Mewalal's first major tournament was the 1948 Summer Olympics in London. As part of the preparation for Olympics, he went to Europe with the national team in July, that won matches against English teams like Pinner F.C., Hayes F.C. and Alexandra Park FC. In the Olympics, Indian team managed by Balaidas Chatterjee, went down 1–2 to France. Following the Olympics, the Talimeren Ao led team played exhibition games, winning a game against the Dutch club AFC Ajax 5–1. He emerged as the top scorer in these games. Mewalal became part of the prominent Indian team during the "golden era" of Indian football, managed by Hyderabad City Police head coach Syed Abdul Rahim, became one of the best teams in Asia.

In March 1951, at the inaugural 1951 Asian Games in New Delhi, he finished as the top scorer with four goals, with India winning the gold medal. Mewalal and his team defeated Iran 1–0 in the gold medal match to gain their first trophy. He was also a part of the team that competed at the 1952 Summer Olympics in Helsinki. He was also part of the national team that toured to several European countries in the late 1940s and played against teams like Denmark, Austria, Switzerland, in which he netted six goals. He later participated in the team's tours of Bangladesh, Afghanistan, Myanmar, and Thailand during the 1950s.

Mewalel was the first player after independence to score a hat-trick for India in a 4–0 victory over Burma in the 1952 Colombo Quadrangular Tournament.

Managerial career
In the mid-1970s, Mewalal became interim manager of India national football team and guided them achieving third place in 1977 King's Cup.

Personal life
Mewalal married Laxmi Devi Lal in 1944 at the age of 18. They had three children together.

He was admitted to a Kolkata hospital on 14 November 2008 after suffering from pneumonia. Diagnosed with a gallstone, he was again admitted on 8 December and was operated upon on 19 December, after which he was placed on a liquid diet. He died on 27 December.

Honours

Player

India
Asian Games Gold medal: 1951
 Colombo Cup: 1952, 1955

Mohun Bagan
IFA Shield: 1947

Bengal
Santosh Trophy: 1950–51, 1953–54

Aryan
IFA Shield runner-up: 1956

Individual
 Asian Games top scorer: 1951
 Calcutta Football League top scorer: 1949, 1951, 1953, 1954, 1958

Manager

India
King's Cup third place: 1977

See also 

 History of Indian football
 List of India national football team hat-tricks
 List of India national football team managers
 History of the India national football team
 India national football team at the Olympics

References

Bibliography

External links
 
 

Indian footballers
Olympic footballers of India
Footballers at the 1948 Summer Olympics
Footballers at the 1952 Summer Olympics
1926 births
2008 deaths
People from Nawada district
Footballers from Bihar
Mohun Bagan AC players
Aryan FC players
India international footballers
Asian Games medalists in football
Footballers at the 1951 Asian Games
Medalists at the 1951 Asian Games
Asian Games gold medalists for India
Association football forwards
Indian football managers
India national football team managers
Calcutta Football League players